Lindsey Nicole Pelas (born May 19, 1991) is an American actress, social media influencer, entrepreneur, and model. She currently models for multiple brands, and has also been featured in publications including Maxim, GQ, Glamour, and has also modeled for Playboy and was the Playboy Cyber Girl of the Month for May 2014.

Pelas is most well known for her social media presence gaining millions of followers on Instagram, Twitter, and Snapchat. Additionally, Pelas is the host and founder of the Eyes Up Here podcast, which is streamed weekly on Focus TV.

Biography

Early life and education 
Pelas was born on May 19, 1991, near Independence, Louisiana. She was one of nine children and attended a rural high school and then Louisiana State University obtaining a bachelor's degree in History. After graduating, Pelas worked as a bartender and yoga instructor.

Modeling 
Pelas began her modeling career in 2013, when she did multiple shoots with Playboy.

Fame 
After her time in Playboy, she moved to Los Angeles where she attended the Halloween party at the Playboy Mansion and had an affair with poker player Dan Bilzerian.

In April 2018, Pelas launched her podcast Eyes Up Here with Lindsey Pelas. Lindsey claims Eyes Up Here with Lindsey Pelas is a way for her to end social stereotyping one topic at a time.

Selected filmography

Film

Television

See also 
 List of glamour models

References

External links 

 
 
 

1991 births
Living people
Female models from Louisiana
Glamour models
Social media influencers
21st-century American women